Bruce John Goodluck  (14 May 1933 – 24 October 2016) was an Australian politician in both the federal and Tasmanian state parliaments.

Born in Hobart, Tasmania, he was a company director before serving on Clarence Municipal Council from 1972 to 1975. He was President of the Australian Automobile Chamber of Commerce in 1974.

In 1975, he was elected to the Australian House of Representatives as the Liberal member for Franklin, defeating Labor MP Ray Sherry. He held the seat until his retirement in 1993.

In 1996 he returned to politics as an independent member of the Tasmanian House of Assembly for the state seat of Franklin; he retired in 1998.

In 2000 Bruce Goodluck was appointed a Member of the Order of Australia (AM). In 2001 he was awarded the Centenary Medal.

He died at the age of 83 on 24 October 2016.

References

 

1933 births
2016 deaths
Liberal Party of Australia members of the Parliament of Australia
Independent members of the Parliament of Tasmania
Members of the Australian House of Representatives for Franklin
Members of the Australian House of Representatives
Members of the Tasmanian House of Assembly
Members of the Order of Australia
Recipients of the Centenary Medal
20th-century Australian politicians